Ricky Enø Jørgensen (born 5 June 1989) is a Danish racing cyclist for Designa Køkken-Knudsgaard. Enø Jørgensen was born in Ilulissat, Greenland, Kingdom of Denmark.

External links

Danish male cyclists
Greenlandic sportspeople
Greenlandic people of Danish descent
Greenlandic Inuit people
People from Ilulissat
1989 births
Living people
Greenlandic sportsmen